The 2012 Henan Jianye F.C. season is Henan's 6th consecutive season in the Chinese Super League. Henan will also be competing in the Chinese FA Cup.

Players

Competitions

Chinese Super League

League table

Matches

Chinese FA Cup

References

Henan Songshan Longmen F.C. seasons
Henan Jianye F.C.